Ceriscoides is a genus of flowering plants in the family Rubiaceae. The genus is found from the Hainan province to tropical Asia.

Species

 Ceriscoides campanulata (Roxb.) Tirveng.
 Ceriscoides celebica Azmi
 Ceriscoides curranii (Merr.) Tirveng.
 Ceriscoides howii H.S.Lo
 Ceriscoides imbakensis Azmi
 Ceriscoides kerrii Azmi
 Ceriscoides mamillata (Craib) Tirveng.
 Ceriscoides parvifolia Azmi
 Ceriscoides perakensis (King & Gamble) K.M.Wong
 Ceriscoides sessiliflora (Wall. ex C.B.Clarcke) Tirveng.
 Ceriscoides turgida (Roxb.) Tirveng.

References

External links 
 Ceriscoides in the World Checklist of Rubiaceae

Rubiaceae genera
Gardenieae